Chanella Stougje (born 23 October 1996) is a Dutch hairdresser and former professional racing cyclist, who rode professionally between 2015 and 2019 for the  and  teams. She was the best young rider at the one-day 2016 Philadelphia Cycling Classic.

In the autumn of 2019, Stougje decided to end her sports career and to focus on social activities.

Major results

2014
 National Junior Road Championships
2nd Time trial
3rd Road race
 UEC European Junior Road Championships
9th Road race
10th Time trial
2015
 7th EPZ Omloop van Borsele
 7th Erondegemse Pijl
2016
 7th Diamond Tour
 9th Ronde van Gelderland

See also
 2015 Parkhotel Valkenburg Continental Team season

References

External links
 

1996 births
Living people
Dutch female cyclists
People from Bernisse
Cyclists from South Holland
Hairdressers
21st-century Dutch women